Rishi Kumar Shukla (born 23 August 1960) is an IPS officer and a former director of Central Bureau of Investigation (CBI), from 2 February 2019 to 2 February 2021.

Education 
Shukla has a post graduate qualification in Philosophy.

Career 
Rishi Kumar Shukla is a 1983 batch Indian Police Service (IPS) officer. After his training stint at the National Police Academy, he was posted in Shivpuri, Damoh, Raipur, and Mandsaur districts of Madhya Pradesh and Chhattisgarh. He has trained in crisis management and negotiations in the United States, and was briefly associated with the Intelligence Bureau handling sensitive cases.

Prior to being appointed as the director of the CBI, he was appointed the director general of Madhya Pradesh Police in 2016 and the chairman of the Madhya Pradesh Police Housing Corporation in Bhopal.

References

1960 births
Living people
Indian Police Service officers
Directors of the Central Bureau of Investigation